Samia wangi, the lesser Atlas moth, is a species of moth in the family Saturniidae. It is found from Taiwan through northern Vietnam to easternmost Xizang, Sichuan, the far south of Shaanxi and southern Zhejiang.

References

External links

Moths described in 2001
Moths of Asia
Saturniinae